James Broughton (November 10, 1913 – May 17, 1999) was an American poet and poetic filmmaker. He was part of the San Francisco Renaissance, a precursor to the Beat poets. He was an early bard of the Radical Faeries, as well as a member of The Sisters of Perpetual Indulgence, serving the community as Sister Sermonetta.

Life and career
Born to wealthy parents in Modesto, California, Broughton's father died when he was five years old in the 1918 influenza epidemic, and he spent his childhood in San Francisco. Before he was three, "Sunny Jim" experienced a transformational visit from his muse, Hermy, which he describes in his autobiography, Coming Unbuttoned (1993):

Broughton was kicked out of military school for having an affair with a classmate, and attended Stanford University before dropping out just before his class graduated in 1935. In 1945, he won the Alden Award given by the Stanford Dramatists' Alliance for his original screenplay Summer Fury. He spent time in Europe during the 1950s, where he received an award in Cannes from Jean Cocteau for the "poetic fantasy" of his film The Pleasure Garden, made in England with partner Kermit Sheets.

Through his career, Broughton produced 23 books and 23 films. In 1967's "summer of love," Broughton made a film, The Bed, which broke taboos against frontal nudity and won prizes at many film festivals. The film rekindled Broughton's filmmaking and led to more films including The Golden Positions, This Is It, The Water Circle, High Kukus, and Dreamwood. Broughton's films developed a following, especially among students at the San Francisco Art Institute, where he taught film (and wrote Seeing the Light, a book about filmmaking) and artistic ritual.

With Joel Singer
As poet Jack Foley writes in All: A James Broughton Reader, "In Broughton’s moment of need, Hermy appeared again in the person of a twenty-five-year-old Canadian film student named Joel Singer... Broughton's meeting with Singer was a life-changing, life-determining moment, that animated his consciousness with a power that lasted until his death." In 2004, Singer wrote of their long relationship and collaboration in White Crane.

With Singer, Broughton traveled and made more films – Hermes Bird (1979), a slow-motion look at an erection shot with the camera developed to photograph atomic bomb explosions, The Gardener of Eden (1981), filmed when they lived in Sri Lanka, Devotions (1983), a study of male relationships, and Scattered Remains (1988), a tribute to Broughton's poetry and filmmaking.

Broughton explored death deeply throughout his life. He died in May 1999 with champagne on his lips, in the house in Port Townsend, Washington, where he and Singer had lived for 10 years. His last words were: "My creeping decrepitude has crept me all the way to the crypt." His gravestone in a Port Townsend cemetery reads, "Adventure – not predicament."

Personal life
In Coming Unbuttoned, Broughton remarks on his love affairs with both men and women. Among his male lovers was gay activist Harry Hay.

Broughton had many creative love affairs during the San Francisco Beat Scene. He briefly lived with the film critic Pauline Kael and they had a daughter, Gina, who was born in 1948. Broughton put off marriage until age 49, when he married Suzanna Hart in a three-day ceremony on the Pacific coast, documented by his friend, the experimental filmmaker Stan Brakhage. Hart and Broughton had two children, and built a counter-culture community along with friends including Alan Watts, Michael McClure, Anna Halprin, and Imogen Cunningham.

Broughton is the subject of the 2012 documentary Big Joy: the Adventures of James Broughton from Stephen Silha, Eric Slade, Dawn Logson and cinematographer Ian Hinkle.

Filmography

 
 The Potted Psalm (with Sidney Peterson) (1946) 18 min
 Mother's Day (1948) 22 min 16 mm
 Adventures of Jimmy (1950) 11 min 16 mm
 Four in the Afternoon (1951) 15 min 16 mm
 Loony Tom, The Happy Lover (1951) 10.5 min 16 mm
 The Pleasure Garden (1953) 38 min 35 mm
 The Bed (1968) 20 min 16 mm
 Nuptiae (1969) 14 min 16 mm
 The Golden Positions (1970) 16 mm
 This Is It (1971) 10 min 16 mm
 Dreamwood (1972) 45 min 16 mm
 High Kukus (1973) 3 min 16 mm 
 Testament (1974) 20 min 16 mm
 The Water Circle (1975) 3 min 16 mm
 Together (with Joel Singer) (1976) 3 min 16 mm
 Erogeny (1976) 6 min 16 mm
 Windowmobile (with Joel Singer) (1977) 8 min 16 mm
 Song of the Godbody (with Joel Singer) (1977) 11 min 16 mm
 Hermes Bird (1979) 11 min 16 mm
 The Gardener of Eden (with Joel Singer) (1981) 8.5 min 16 mm
 Shaman Psalm (with Joel Singer) (1981) 7 min 16 mm
 Devotions (with Joel Singer) (1983) 22 min 16 mm
 Scattered Remains (with Joel Singer) (1988) 14 min 16 mm

Bibliography

 Songs for Certain Children (1947) San Francisco: Adrian Wilson
 The Playground (1949) San Francisco: Centaur Press
 Musical Chairs (1950) San Francisco: Centaur Press
 The Ballad of Mad Jenny (1950) San Francisco: Centaur Press
 An Almanac for Amorists (1955) Paris: Collection Merlin
 True & False Unicorn (1957) New York: Grove Press
 The Right Playmate (1964) San Francisco: Pearce & Bennett
 Tidings (1965) San Francisco: Pterodactyl Press
 High Kukus (1969) New York: Jargon Society
 A Long Undressing (1971) New York: Jargon Society
 Erogeny: A Geographical Expedition (1976) San Francisco: ManRoot Books
 Seeing the Light (1977) republished as Making Light of It (1992) San Francisco: City Lights Books
 Odes for Odd Occasions (1977) San Francisco: Manroot Press
 The Androgyne Journal (1977) Oakland, CA: Scrimshaw Press
 Hymns to Hermes (1979) San Francisco: Manroot Press
 Graffiti for the Johns of Heaven (1982) Mill Valley, CA: Syzygy Press
 Ecstasies (1983) Mill Valley, CA: Syzygy Press
 A to Z: 26 Sermonettes (1986) Mill Valley, CA: Syzygy Press
 Hooplas (1988) San Francisco: Pennywhistle Press
 75 Life Lines (1988) Winston-Salem, NC: Jargon Society
 Special Deliveries: Selected Poems (1990) Seattle, WA: Broken Moon Press
 Coming Unbuttoned (1993) San Francisco: City Lights Press
 Little Sermons of the Big Joy (1994) Philadelphia, PA: Insight to Riot Press
 Little Prayers to Big Joy's Mother (1995) Port Townsend, WA: Syzygy Press
 Packing Up for Paradise: Selected Poems 1946-1996 (1997) Santa Barbara, CA & Ann Arbor, MI: Black Sparrow Press
 ALL: A James Broughton Reader (2007) edited by Jack Foley, Brooklyn, NY: White Crane Books

CollectionsThe Films of James Broughton, a DVD compilation of seventeen films on three discs, was released in 2006 by Facets Multimedia.

A selected collection of his work, All: A James Broughton Reader, edited by Jack Foley, was released in 2007 by White Crane Books.

References

External links

Films of James Broughton
 Big Joy: The Adventures of James Broughton, 2013 documentary film
Morris, Gary. "Laughing Pan: James Broughton" Bright Lights Film Journal'', issue 27 (2000)

1913 births
1999 deaths
People from Modesto, California
Bisexual men
American experimental filmmakers
Beat Generation writers
Radical Faeries members
LGBT film directors
LGBT people from California
Writers from the San Francisco Bay Area
20th-century American LGBT people
American bisexual writers